Mark Lewis (born 1958 in Mullumbimby, Australia) is an Australian documentary film and television producer, director and writer. He is famous for his film Cane Toads: An Unnatural History and for his body of work on animals. Unlike many other producers of nature films, his films do not attempt to document the animals in question or their behaviors but rather the complex relationships between people and society and the animals they interact with.

His films have earned him many awards, including a British Academy Award nomination, a nomination from the Directors Guild of America, two Emmy's for Outstanding Direction in documentary film, and an Emmy Award for Outstanding Science Program on American Television.

As a student Lewis helped planning Philippe Petit's famous 1974 high-wire walk between the Twin Towers of the World Trade Center. He talks about his involvement in the acclaimed documentary Man on Wire (2008).

Filmography
 Cane Toads: The Conquest (2010)
 The Pursuit of Excellence (2007) 
 The Floating Brothel (2006)
 The Standard of Perfection: Show Cats and The Standard of Perfection - Show Cattle (2006)
 The Natural History of the Chicken (2000)
 Animalicious (1999)
 Rat (1998)
 The Wonderful World of Dogs (1990)
 Round the Twist (1989) 
 Cane Toads: An Unnatural History  (1988)

Lewis produces and directs extensively for television.

References

External links
 Mark Lewis: Radio Pictures
  UpNorth Media Center July 30, 2010
 

Living people
Australian documentary filmmakers
People from the Northern Rivers
1958 births